The 2022 Utah Senate elections were held on November 8, 2022, as part of the biennial 2022 United States elections. 15 of the 29 seats in the Utah Senate were up for election. The Democratic Convention was held on April 9, 2022. The Republican Convention was held on April 23, 2022. Primary elections were held on June 28, 2022. The elections coincided with elections for other offices in Utah, including the US Senate, US House, and the Utah House.
 
Following the 2022 elections, Republicans maintained their supermajority with an unchanged 23-to-6 member advantage over Democrats.

Retirements

Democrats
District 4: Jani Iwamoto retired.

Predictions

Defeated Incumbents

Primary Election
District 9: Democrat Derek Kitchen lost renomination to Jennifer Plumb.
District 13: Democrat Gene Davis lost renomination to Nate Blouin.

Holdover Senators
Due to redistricting changing the districts for most incumbents, fourteen holdover Senators were not up for election in 2022, yet their district boundaries and numbers did change. These holdover Senators in 2022 were:
District 2: Republican Chris H. Wilson
District 3: Republican John Johnson
District 4: Republican D. Gregg Buxton
District 8: Republican Todd Weiler
District 10: Democrat Luz Escamilla
District 15: Democrat Kathleen Riebe
District 16: Republican Wayne Harper
District 17: Republican Lincoln Fillmore
District 22: Republican Jake Anderegg
District 24: Republican Curt Bramble
District 25: Republican Mike McKell
District 26: Republican David Hinkins
District 27: Republican Derrin Owens
District 29: Republican Don Ipson

Results

Close races

Summary of Results by State Senate District
Note: Incumbent Senators with gray backgrounds were not up for election in 2022; however, they may have been redistricted to new district numbers.
Elections were held in 2022 in districts 1, 5, 6, 7, 9, 11, 12, 13, 14, 18, 19, 20, 21, 23, and 28.

Election Results Source:

Detailed Results

Election Results Source:

District 1

District 5

District 6

District 7

District 9

District 11

District 12

District 13

District 14

District 18

District 19

District 20

District 21

District 23

District 28

References

See also 

Utah Senate
Utah State Senate elections
2022 Utah elections